2018 East Kalimantan Governor Cup or 2018 East Borneo Governor Cup was the second edition of East Kalimantan Governor Cup football championship, which was held by the Football Association of Indonesia (PSSI) as pre-season tournament during 2018 Liga 1 season break. The tournament started on 23 February 2018 and ended on 4 March 2018. The broadcasting rights were granted solely to MNCTV.

Teams
Eight clubs participated in the 2018 East Kalimantan Governor Cup. The clubs were divided into two groups, each filled with four participants.
Bali United withdrew from the competition due to the absence of their coach and lack of players, therefore PSIS Semarang came in as replacement.

Venues

Group stage

Group A 
 All matches played in Samarinda, East Kalimantan
 Times listed are local (UTC+8:00)

Group B
 All matches played in Balikpapan, East Kalimantan
 Times listed are local (UTC+8:00)

Knockout stage

Bracket

Semi-finals

Third place

Final

Awards

Goalscorers

References

Association football competitions in Asia
Piala Gubernur Kaltim
Sport in East Kalimantan
2018 domestic association football cups